Tyne and Wear
Monuments and memorials in Tyne and Wear
King G
King G
Lists of buildings and structures in Tyne and Wear